Sir Ab or Sirab may refer to:

Sirab, Hamadan
Sir Ab, Qazvin

See also
Sirab, Azerbaijan